Oregon Ballot Measure 39, passed in the 2006 General Election, is a ballot measure that prohibits the government from condemning property from one private party (by eminent domain) on behalf of another private party.

Advocates both for and against the measure advanced misleading arguments during the 2006 campaign: once in a Voter's Pamphlet article by the League of Women Voters, and again in a radio advertisement by Oregonians In Action.

Financing
The campaign for Measure 39 was heavily financed by Oregonians In Action, a political action committee that previously drove the campaign for Oregon Ballot Measure 37 (2004).

See also 
 List of Oregon ballot measures

References

2006 Oregon ballot measures
Eminent domain
Initiatives in the United States